Even before Northern Ireland was established, there were a small number of ethnic minorities living in the area. During the Troubles (1970s, 1980s and 1990s) levels of immigration to Northern Ireland were normally low, nevertheless that does not mean they were insignificant, having contributed to Northern Ireland in economy, business and professional skills. However, there has been an increase since the Good Friday Agreement brought an end to most of the violence.

The majority of ethnic minority people live in the Greater Belfast area, although they live across Northern Ireland, groups are concentrated in other parts of the province.

Black African and Afro-Caribbean

Many people of African descent live in Northern Ireland. This includes those from the Afro-Caribbean community as well as those from African countries. Many are professionals.

George Henry Thompson was 'a negro that lived among the Protestants of Shankill Road' in the 1860s, and led a mob evicting Catholics. In the county Antrim Assizes of 1873, he was arrested and sentenced to two years in prison.

Louis Scott has been mentioned as 'one of a few black members of the Ulster Defence Association' in Henry McDonald and Jim Cusack's UDA: inside the heart of loyalist terror.

In January 1980, Max Olorunda, an accountant born in Nigeria, was killed by an incendiary bomb planted by the IRA aboard a train travelling from Ballymena to Belfast when it detonated prematurely in Dunmurry. His daughter Jayne published a book 'Legacy' in 2013 detailing the impact this had on her and her family.

Lillian Seenoi-Barr was the first Black councillor and the first Black politician in Northern Ireland when she was selected for an SDLP seat for Foyleside, Derry City Council in 2021. She has Kenyan heritage and lived in Northern Ireland for over a decade before her election.

Asian

Chinese
The first ethnic minority to arrive in significant numbers was the people of Chinese origin. There were 3,329 people speaking Chinese as their main language in 2021.

A period of time in the 1960s occurred when the first Chinese immigrants to Northern Ireland were able to settle in the country. Chinese restaurants are without a doubt the most prevalent non-native restaurant genre in Northern Ireland, as many of the original immigrants set up a food outlet in order to support their families in the region.

According to the Chinese embassy there are nearly 10,000 overseas Chinese residents in Northern Ireland, as of 2007. This figure may or may not include people of Chinese origin from elsewhere than China.

Anna Lo was born in North Point, British Hong Kong to Cantonese Chinese parents. She moved to Northern Ireland in 1974.

Lo stood as an Alliance Party candidate at the 2007 Northern Ireland Assembly election and was elected in Belfast South. and re-elected in 2011.  Lo was selected as the Alliance Party's candidate for the Northern Ireland constituency in the 2014 European Parliament election and won the best ever European election performance for the party, but was not elected

She has been the target of racial abuse by Ulster loyalists and did not stand for re-election as MLA in 2016 as a result.

South Asian
Apart from the minority groups from Asia, most came from Commonwealth countries such as India and  Pakistan. This immigration has led to the building of Belfast Islamic Centre and also a Hindu Temple to cater for spiritual needs of Hindu people. There is also an Asian supermarket on the Ormeau Road in Belfast. Most South Asians live in Central and Southern Belfast, in areas such as Ballynafeigh and Shaftesbury.

European

Portuguese
There are over 1,000 speakers of Portuguese in Northern Ireland. This wave has been more recent, having started in the 1990s. Northern Ireland's Portuguese population is located primarily in Dungannon, County Tyrone (where many work in the Moy Park factory) and Portadown, County Armagh.

Polish
There are now believed to be 30,000 Polish people living in Northern Ireland. This influx has been relatively recent, and has increased since Poland joined the European Union, with many coming on a short-term basis for work. A recent report showed that in the Police Service of Northern Ireland's most recent recruitment drive, nearly 1,000 Polish people applied to become officers. There are a lot of Polish people in Antrim, County Antrim.

Notable people
There are a number of well known people from Northern Ireland who are from an ethnic minority background. Chaim Herzog, President of Israel from 1983 to 1993, was born in Belfast. Others include the broadcaster Lata Sharma (who is Asian), Andre Shoukri, a convicted UDA terrorist whose father is from Egypt, the Liberal Democrat politician Lembit Opik, who is of Estonian parentage, and the Alliance Party assembly member for South Belfast, Anna Lo MLA, who is Hong Kong Chinese. Freddie Scappaticci and Angelo Fusco were two IRA members of Italian ancestry. Lilian Seenoi-Barr is the first Black Politician in NI and was selected for a Foyleside seat in Derry Council by the SDLP in 2021

See also
Religion in Northern Ireland

References

Demographics of Northern Ireland
Ethnic groups in Northern Ireland